Austrocotesia is a genus of braconid wasps in the family Braconidae. There are about five described species in Austrocotesia, found in Oceania and the Neotropics.

Species
These five species belong to the genus Austrocotesia:
 Austrocotesia croizati Valerio & Whitfield, 2005 (Colombia, Ecuador)
 Austrocotesia delicata Austin & Dangerfield, 1992 (Australia, Papua New Guinea)
 Austrocotesia exigua Austin & Dangerfield, 1992 (Papua New Guinea)
 Austrocotesia paradoxa Austin & Dangerfield, 1992 (Papua New Guinea)
 Austrocotesia renei Valerio & Whitfield, 2005 (Ecuador)

References

Microgastrinae